Comtel Air was an Austrian company executive aviation and commercial airline service based at Vienna.

History
Financial concerns were raised in November 2011, when a Comtel Air flight, from Amritsar in India, to Birmingham in the UK, was delayed in Vienna, Austria for refueling the aircraft,  and passengers were required to pay the approximately GB£20,000 bill.

Destinations

As of November 2011, Comtel Air served six cities in five countries:

Vienna - Vienna Airport (base)

Amritsar - Sri Guru Ram Dass Jee International Airport (charter)

Bergamo - Bergamo Airport

Birmingham - Birmingham International Airport
London - London Stansted Airport

Fleet
Comtel Air operated the following:

1 Boeing 757-200 (operated by Mint Airways)
1 Dassault Falcon 2000

References

External links

BBC News; Passenger films 'ransomed' Comtel flight to Birmingham

Defunct airlines of Austria
Airlines established in 2011
Airlines disestablished in 2011
2011 disestablishments in Austria
Companies based in Vienna
Austrian companies established in 2011